

See also 
 Lists of fossiliferous stratigraphic units in Europe

References 
 

 
Georgia (country) geography-related lists
.
 Georgia
 Georgia